The Ern Westmore Hollywood Glamour Show (also known as The Ern Westmore Show) is an American television program that was syndicated in 1953 and carried on  ABC from August 7, 1955, until September 11, 1955. 

The show was hosted by Hollywood make-up artist Ern Westmore, who offered beauty tips to viewers and gave a makeover to a member of the studio audience, who was then serenaded by a vocal singer, similar to the end of the Miss America Pageant. It was produced by Kroger Babb and, along with Turn to a Friend, was part of a two-program entry by ABC into daytime TV. Besides Westmore, the show featured Dick Hyde, Betty Egan, Eddie Varden, Helen Winston, and Robert and Helen Little.

At times the program originated from local TV stations, including WAFM in Birmingham, WKRC in Cincinnati, and WTVJ in Miami. The ABC version of the program, also known as Hollywood Backstage, was broadcast from 7:30 to 8 p.m. Eastern Time on Sundays.

A review in the October 17, 1953, issue of the trade publication Billboard described Westmore as "ultra-candid" in the episode that was reviewed and said that he was "far too clipped and cold in his frank appraisal of the grooming deficiencies" of women in the audience.

The show's final broadcast, and that of Turn to a Friend, came on December 31, 1953, as ABC shifted its focus from afternoon programming to morning shows.

References

Bibliography
 
 Frank Westmore and Muriel Davidson. The Westmores of Hollywood. Lippincott, Philadelphia, 1976.
 Internet Movie Database: Ern Westmore. URL accessed 13 January 2006.

1953 American television series debuts
1953 American television series endings
1950s American reality television series
Fashion-themed television series
American Broadcasting Company original programming
English-language television shows